The American Warmblood is a horse of warmblood type, intended primarily for the traditional sport horse disciplines of dressage, show jumping, eventing and combined driving.

Characteristics 
Horses of nearly all bloodlines are eligible for registration as American Warmbloods, as long as they are of a sport horse or warmblood type, and are able to meet the appropriate studbook selection or performance criteria.

The emphasis is on the quality of each individual horse, for both registration and breeding approval.  While the ideal horse for registration is already a warmblood type, there are no breed restrictions for American Warmbloods.  Horses which are 100% hot or cold blooded are not typical, but can be registered if they are able to meet the registry's performance standards (this would include draft horses, Arabians, and Thoroughbreds). Gaited horse breeds (like the Tennessee Walker, Missouri Fox Trotter, or Icelandic horses) are also non-typical, though if they are able to perform walk-trot-canter in the appropriate levels of the accepted disciplines, they too can be eligible for registration.

Horses which fail to meet or have yet to meet these performance criteria may still be issued recording papers, but are not considered registered American Warmbloods until they satisfy performance or inspection standards.

Breeding stock must be approved for breeding through studbook inspection, which requires mares and stallions to meet even more stringent inspection and/or performance criteria.

Breed history 
There are two registries in the United States which recognize American Warmbloods - the American Warmblood Society & Sporthorse Registry and the American Warmblood Registry, both of which are recognized by the World Breeding Federation for Sport Horses (WBFSH).

The American Warmblood is more of a "type" than a "breed". Like most of the European warmbloods, the American Warmblood has an "open" book.  There is more emphasis on producing quality sport horses, rather than the preservation of any particular bloodlines, which allows for much diversity in the bloodlines of American Warmbloods.

The American Warmblood has been influenced by the European warmbloods, the Thoroughbred and the Arabian, as well as some draft horse breeds.

Both registries have also begun sport pony books, creating similar performance registries for North American ponies.

References 

American Warmblood Society & Sporthorse Registry
American Warmblood Registry

See also 
 List of horse breeds
 Sport horse
 Warmbloods

Horse breeds originating in the United States
Horse breeds
Warmbloods